Hopton is a small village adjacent to the village of Carsington and two miles from the market town of Wirksworth in the Peak District.

Evidence of humans visiting, possibly 200,000 years ago during a warm period known as the Aveley Interglacial, is given by the discovery of a Middle Paleolithic Acheulean hand axe nearby.

Hopton is first mentioned in the Domesday book in 1086 as a berewick (supporting farm) of the town and manor of Wirksworth and its two main industries from ancient times have been farming and lead mining.

Hopton lies just off the main B5035 road from Ashbourne to Wirksworth at the northern end of Carsington Water.

The village had a long association with the Gell family, who have had assets in the Hopton since 1327, and had extensive lead mining interests in the Wirksworth area and lived at Hopton Hall. Notable members include Sir John Gell who was a Parliamentarian in the English Civil War and Sir William Gell who was an archaeologist.

Modern Hopton is a rather straggling village with a number of houses some of which are popular for self-catering activities for tourists visiting the Peak District, Wirksworth and Carsington Water.

See also
Listed buildings in Hopton, Derbyshire

References 

Hamlets in Derbyshire
Towns and villages of the Peak District
Derbyshire Dales